Berlin is an unincorporated community and census-designated place (CDP) in central Berlin Township, Holmes County, Ohio, United States. As of the 2020 census it had a population of 1,447.

Geography
Berlin is situated in east-central Holmes County at the junction of U.S. Route 62 and State Route 39. US-62 leads northeast  to Wilmot, and State Route 39 leads southeast  to Sugarcreek. Together, the two highways lead west  to Millersburg, the Holmes county seat.

Berlin is located at latitude 40° 33' 40" north and longitude 81° 47' 40" west. The ZIP code is 44610 and the FIPS place code is 05816.

History

The village of Berlin - the oldest existing village in Holmes County - was first planned on July 2, 1816, by John Swigert, a native of Berlin, Germany. Swigert's plan provided for 108 lots to be arrayed along two streets, one north-south and the other east-west.  Another early settler, Joseph Troyer, hailed from Berlin, Pennsylvania, and together Swigert and Troyer bestowed upon the new settlement the shared name of their respective home towns. Berlin is located at a high point in Holmes County, and local legend holds that Swigert chose the site because, thus situated, the town could be more readily defended against Indian attack.

A large share of the early settlers of the Berlin area were of German or Swiss ancestry and came to Ohio via Pennsylvania.

In 1818, a school was established in Berlin and in 1822 a post office. These were soon followed by Methodist, Presbyterian, Baptist and Mennonite churches. Later, Amish settlers began to arrive. Berlin enjoyed commercial and industrial growth, and during the 19th century was home to machine shops, a foundry, blacksmith shops, a hat factory, hotels, an auction house, and a variety of retail establishments. Berlin was described in 1833 as having 21 residential houses, two stores, two taverns and a physician.

Today, Berlin is in the center of Ohio's largest Amish community and is home to the Amish and Mennonite Heritage Center, featuring the Amish and Anabaptist history cyclorama, Behalt. Ohio has about 56,000 Amish residents, an increase of 60 percent since 1992.

Notable people
Atlee Pomerene, U.S. senator
Nate Torrence, television actor
Alta Weiss, early semiprofessional female baseball player

See also 
Berlin, Williams County, Ohio

References

Census-designated places in Ohio
Census-designated places in Holmes County, Ohio
German-American culture in Ohio
Amish in Ohio
Swiss-American culture in Ohio
1816 establishments in Ohio
Populated places established in 1816